Sheng is the Mandarin pinyin and Wade–Giles romanization of the Chinese surname written  in Chinese character. It is romanized as Shing in Cantonese. Sheng is listed 146th in the Song dynasty classic text Hundred Family Surnames. As of 2008, it is the 175th most common surname in China, shared by 700,000 people.

Notable people
Sheng Xian (2nd century), Eastern Han dynasty official
Sheng Yanshi (盛彦师; died 622), Sui dynasty rebel leader under Li Yuan
Sheng Wenyu (盛文鬱; 1316–1370), Yuan dynasty rebel leader under Han Shantong
Sheng Yong (盛庸; 1334–1403), Ming dynasty general
Sheng Ne (盛訥; 16th century), Ming dynasty Vice Minister of Personnel
Sheng Yihong (盛以弘; 17th century), Ming dynasty Minister of Rites, son of Sheng Ne
Sheng Fusheng (盛符升; 17th century), Qing dynasty poet and official
Sheng Kang (盛康; 1814–1902), Qing dynasty official, father of Sheng Xuanhuai
Sheng Xuanhuai (盛宣懷; 1844–1916), Qing dynasty tycoon, Minister of Transport, and founder of several universities
Sheng Zhushu (盛竹书; 1860–1927), chairman of the Bank of Communications
Sheng Pihua (盛丕华; 1882–1961), entrepreneur, Vice Mayor of Shanghai
Sheng Enyi (盛恩頤; 1892–1958), businessman and banker, son of Sheng Xuanhuai
Sheng Shicai (1895–1970), warlord who ruled Xinjiang province
Sheng Aiyi (1900–1983), businesswoman, daughter of Sheng Xuanhuai
Sheng Zhenwei (盛振爲; 1900–1997), legal theorist, dean of Soochow University law school
Sheng Wen (盛文; 1906–1971), Republic of China lieutenant general
Sheng Tongsheng (1911–1987), agronomist, member of the Chinese Academy of Sciences
Sheng Jinzhang (盛金章; 1921–2007), palaeontologist, member of the Chinese Academy of Sciences
Cao Ying, born Sheng Junfeng (1923–2015), translator
Sheng Huaren (盛华仁; born 1935), former CEO of China Petrochemical Corporation
Sheng Chu-ju (盛竹如; born 1940), Taiwanese journalist and anchor, son of Sheng Wen
Sheng Zhongguo (1941–2018), violinist
Sheng Guangzu (born 1949), Minister of Railways
Sheng Xue (born 1962), Chinese-Canadian journalist and writer
Emile Sheng (born 1968), Minister of Council for Cultural Affairs of the Republic of China (2009–2011)
Xiaodong Sheng (born 1998), China-born Canadian badminton player
Sheng Zetian (born 1972), wrestler, three-time Olympic medalist
Sheng Chien (盛鑑; born 1973), Taiwanese Peking opera performer and actor
James Shing (盛品儒; born 1976), former executive of Asia Television, descendant of Sheng Xuanhuai
Sheng Peng (born 1989), football player

References

Chinese-language surnames
Individual Chinese surnames